JGB may refer to:

J. G. Ballard, British science fiction writer
Jerry Garcia Band, a band led by Grateful Dead co-founder Jerry Garcia
JGB (band), a band led by former Jerry Garcia Band keyboardist Melvin Seals that continues the musical tradition of the Jerry Garcia band
Jagdalpur Airport, which has an IATA airport code of JGB
Japanese government bond, see National debt of Japan